Tsankov may refer to:
Tsankov (surname)
Tsankov Dam on the Vacha River in Bulgaria
Tsankov Kamak Hydro Power Plant in southwestern Bulgaria
Dragan Tsankov Boulevard in Sofia, Bulgaria